Los Momentos ("The Moments"), the sixth studio album by Mexican recording artist Julieta Venegas, was released 19 March 2013 by Sony Music Mexico.  The first single from Los Momentos is "Tuve Para Dar," and the album features collaborations with Ceci Bastida, Natalia Lafourcade, Ana Tijoux and Rubén Albarrán (vocalist from Café Tacvba).

Background

After Venegas' last performance on her worldwide "Otra Cosa Tour," she announced a break to begin recording her new studio album. 
She stated in an article with the Mexican newspaper Milenio that it would be recorded from home so she could play the dual role of recording artist and mother.
After a nine-month hiatus from performing, the "European Tour July 2012" was announced on July 4, 2012 with scheduled stops in France, several cities in Spain and Germany. Upon return from the tour to Mexico City in August, Venegas continued recording her album and posted its progress with photos and videos on her official website as well as her Facebook fan page.
On October 8, 2012, she performed a series of concerts in Colombia where she spoke to the press about the new album which would be produced by herself and producer Yamil Rezc.
On October 16, 2012 Julieta Venegas announced on Twitter, "I have the title for the album! It's called Los Momentos ... and the first single is called Tuve para dar."

Promotion

On January 18–20, 2013, Julieta Venegas performed at the Festival de Olmué in Chile, and on March 5, 2013 she visited Volkshaus Zurich in Zurich, Switzerland to promote the album.

Track listing

Singles

The first single will be released from this album is "Tuve para dar" which will be released in November 2012. The song was inspired by the situation in Mexico and the difficult times the country is experiencing. The video for the single was recorded in Mexico City and released along with the single and was directed by Gregory W. Allen and Yvonne Venegas.

References

2013 albums
Julieta Venegas albums
Sony Music Mexico albums